Nguyễn Ngọc Thanh (born September 20, 1982 in Vietnam) is a retired Vietnamese footballer who played for the Vietnam national football team and SHB Đà Nẵng, Quảng Nam and Cần Thơ in the V-League.

International goals

References

External links 

Profile

1982 births
Living people
Vietnamese footballers
Vietnam international footballers
Sportspeople from Ho Chi Minh City
Association football forwards
SHB Da Nang FC players
Haiphong FC players
V.League 1 players
Quang Nam FC players